H43 may refer to:
 H-43 Huskie, a United States Air Force helicopter
 H43 Lund, a handball team from Sweden
 Hanriot H.43, a 1927 French military utility aircraft 
 , a Royal Navy  H-class submarine
 , a Royal Navy H-class destroyer